The International Congress on the Archaeology of the Ancient Near East (ICAANE) is a biennial conference cycle initiated by archaeologists from several European universities. The first ICAANE took place in Rome in 1998. Since then the congress has been held every other spring at a different European university. The host of each ICAANE is chosen two years in advance by the ICAANE Scientific Committee. In 2018, in Munich, the decision of arranging the next congress was taken and the University of Bologna was chosen as the host of the 12 ICAANE. This event was subsequently delayed to 2021 as a result of the COVID-19 crisis.

List of all ICAANE conferences

8 ICAANE Warsaw 2012 

On April 30 – May 4, 2012 the 8 ICAANE took place in Warsaw. It was organized by the Polish Centre of Mediterranean Archaeology of the University of Warsaw, Institute of Archaeology of the University of Warsaw and the Kazimierz Michałowski Foundation. The congress was attended by nearly 1000 participants who delivered 450 speeches. The media patronage of the 8 ICAANE was undertaken by the National Geographic Polska. The 8 ICAANE Warsaw Organizing Committee also obtained honorary patronages of the President of the Republic of Poland, Bronisław Komorowski, the Minister of Science and Higher Education, Prof. Barbara Kudrycka, and the Minister of Foreign Affairs, Radosław Sikorski.

References

External links 
 International Congress on the Archaeology of the Ancient Near East
 12th International Congress on the Archaeology of the Ancient Near East, Bologna

Academic conferences
Archaeology of the Near East